The Republic of Poland Ambassador to Latvia is the leader of the Poland delegation, Poland Mission to Latvia.

As with all Poland Ambassadors, the ambassador to Latvia is nominated by the President of Poland and confirmed by the Parliamentary Commission of the Foreign Affairs. The ambassador serves at the pleasure of the president, and enjoys full diplomatic immunity.

Poland Embassy in Latvia is located in Riga.

History 
Poland recognised independence of Latvia on January 27, 1921. In 1939, diplomatic relations between Poland and Latvia were dissolved because of the Soviet-German Molotov–Ribbentrop Pact, which expropriated among others Poland and Latvia. Between 1939 and 1991 there were no official relations between Polish People's Republic led by communists and Latvian Soviet Socialist Republic which was a part of the Soviet Union. In 1991 diplomatic relations between Poland and Latvia were restored.

List of ambassadors of Poland to Latvia

Second Polish Republic 

 1919-1920: Bronisław Bouffałł (delegate of the mission)
 1920-1921: Witold Kamieniecki (envoy)
 1921-1923: Witold Jodko-Narkiewicz (envoy)
 1923-1926: Aleksander Ładoś (envoy)
 1926-1929: Juliusz Łukasiewicz (envoy)
 1929-1932: Mirosław Arciszewski (envoy)
 1933-1935: Zygmunt Beczkowicz (envoy)
 1936-1938: Franciszek Charwat (envoy)
 1938-1939: Jerzy Tadeusz Kłopotowski (chargé d’affaires)

Third Polish Republic 

 1991-1997: Jarosław Lindenberg
 1997-2001: Jarosław Bratkiewicz
 2001-2005: Tadeusz Fiszbach
 2005-2009: Maciej Klimczak
 2010-2014: Jerzy Marek Nowakowski
 2015-2017: Ewa Dębska
 2017-2018: Ewelina Brudnicka (chargé d’affaires)
 since 2018: Monika Michaliszyn

References 

Latvia
Poland
Ambassadors of Poland to Latvia